Michelle Louise Harvey (born in Brisbane) is an Australian forensic scientist specialising in forensic entomology (use of insects in the investigation of crimes). Her research uses insect DNA to identify maggots, which helps in estimating the time since death. Harvey has published widely on her research and been a guest speaker at many conferences. She is active in the promotion of science through public speaking engagements and the media.

Career
Harvey completed her PhD / Master of Forensic Science degree in 2006 at the Centre for Forensic Science at the University of Western Australia (UWA) and graduated in March 2007. From 2006 to 2012 she was a senior lecturer in forensic biology at the University of Portsmouth, researching molecular relationships between forensically important Calliphoridae. She has since returned to Australia to continue her research at Deakin University, Geelong.

Honours and awards
2013 Winston Churchill Fellow
2004 Brownes Western Australian Woman of the Year in Science
2003 Sir Keith Murdoch Fellow of the American-Australian Association (graduate research at the Anthropological Research Facility (known as the Body Farm) in Knoxville, Tennessee)
2001/2002 Rotary Ambassadorial Scholar (University of Pretoria, South Africa)

References

1978 births
Living people
People from Brisbane
Academics of the University of Portsmouth
Women forensic scientists
University of Western Australia alumni
University of Pretoria alumni
Academic staff of Deakin University